Linfield University is a private university with campuses in McMinnville, and Portland, Oregon. Linfield Wildcats athletics participates in the NCAA Division III Northwest Conference. Linfield reported a combined 1,755 students after the fall 2022 census date. The institution officially changed its name from Linfield College to Linfield University, effective July 1, 2020.

History

Linfield traces its history back to the earliest days of Oregon Territory, when pioneer Baptists in Oregon City created the Oregon Baptist Educational Society in 1848. This society was organized to establish a Baptist school in the region, which began as Oregon City College in 1849. In 1855, Sebastian C. Adams began to agitate for a school in McMinnville. Adams and his associates were members of the Christian Church, and so the school became a Christian School. To begin,  of property were donated by W. T. Newby and a group was formed to establish the school. The group included William Dawson, James McBride,  Newby, and Adams, and they bore the major part of the expenses of starting the school. These men built a building and convinced Adams, who was a teacher, to operate the school.  After about a year and a half and because of the difficulty of running the school alone and funding problems, Adams suggested that the school be turned over to the Baptists who were attempting to start up the West Union Institute that had been chartered in 1858 by the Oregon Territorial Legislature. The Adams group imposed the condition that the Baptists keep at least one professor employed continuously in the college department. Other accounts indicate that the Baptist group purchased the land in 1857 in order to start their school.
The Oregon Territorial Legislature chartered the Baptist College at McMinnville in 1858.  The school later became McMinnville College in 1898.

In 1922, the name was changed to Linfield College in memory of a Baptist minister, the Rev. George Fisher Linfield whose widow, Frances Eleanor Ross Linfield, gave a substantial donation to the college to promote Christian education and as a memorial to her late husband.  Mrs. Linfield served as Dean of Women from 1921 to 1928, and sat on the Board of Directors from 1922 to her death in 1940.  Her gift included real estate in Spokane, Washington, valued at $250,000 (a sum worth nearly $4 million in 2020).  In his 1938 book, Bricks Without Straw: The Story of Linfield College, Professor Jonas A. "Steine" Jonasson quotes from the minutes of the college's board of trustees to explain Mrs. Linfield's motivation for her large land gift to the college: "Mrs. Linfield's dual purpose in making the gift to McMinnville College was to 'perpetuate the name, scholarly attainments and Christian influence of her late husband, Rev. George Fisher Linfield, and to promote the cause of Christian education.

The Linfield Division of Continuing Education (an Adult Degree Program) began in 1975. Today it serves eight communities in Oregon as well as online degree programs giving working adults the opportunity to complete a bachelor's degree or certificate program.

In 1982, the Linfield College-Portland Campus was established when the college entered into an affiliation with Legacy Good Samaritan Hospital & Medical Center and began offering a bachelor's degree program in nursing.

Linfield offered buyouts to 13 professors in liberal-arts programs with shrinking enrollment in 2019, shortly after President Miles K. Davis arrived. He also announced efforts to shift resources to the nursing and business programs, which account for the majority of students. Those shifts led to strained relationships with some faculty members in the traditional liberals arts disciplines.

The school officially changed its name to Linfield University, effective on July 1, 2020.

Sexual abuse and anti-Semitism allegations
Following sexual abuse charges against a former trustee that involved students in 2017 and 2019, faculty members voted 88 to 18 on a motion of no confidence in David C. Baca, the chair of the college's board of trustees, in May, 2020. The board continued to support Baca who offered to resign.

Students then circulated a petition calling for Baca to step down from his position.  An outside agency also investigated a claim made by a faculty member of "inappropriate touching" by two trustees.

In April 2021, President Miles K. Davis was accused by several faculty members of making anti-Semitic remarks. Davis denied the allegations in a letter to the Anti-Defamation League, which has suggested an investigation into the claims as well as anti-Semitism and bias training for university leaders. An earlier investigation into alleged remarks by Davis substantiated one allegation but was unable to confirm the other claims. One of the faculty members filed a complaint with the Oregon Bureau of Labor and Industries, claiming religious retaliation and harassment by Davis and Baca. On April 19, 2021, university faculty members passed a resolution of no confidence in Davis and Baca, and called for their resignations. The college fired one of the whistleblowers, a Jewish tenured professor, who filed a lawsuit against the school. In February, 2023, the university reached a $1 million settlement with the fired professor.

In September 2021, Baca stepped down as chair of the board of trustees.

Portland Campus
Linfield established a presence in Portland, Oregon, in 1982 in historic Northwest Portland. The campus, Linfield-Good Samaritan School of Nursing, was adjacent to the Legacy Good Samaritan Hospital and Medical Center. The Portland Campus became the successor to the Good Samaritan Hospital Diploma School of Nursing, established by Emily Loveridge in 1890.

In February 2021, Linfield opened a new 20-acre campus in northeast Portland, acquired from the University of Western States.

Accreditation

Linfield University is institutionally accredited by the Northwest Commission on Colleges and Universities. Specialized accreditation is granted to individual programs. The Linfield-Good Samaritan School of Nursing is accredited by the Oregon State Board of Nursing and the Commission on Collegiate Nursing Education. The education program is approved for training of education and secondary teachers by the State of Oregon's Teachers Standards and Practices Commission. Linfield University's music program is accredited by the National Association of Schools of Music, and its athletic training program is accredited by the Commission on Accreditation of Athletic Training Education.

Academics

A 2015 study from The Economist ranked Linfield 27th nationally out of 1,275 colleges and universities when it came to the economic value of a degree. Also in 2015, Linfield was ranked among the best in the Pacific Northwest when it comes to admitting students from disadvantaged families and helping them move up the economic ladder. The study, "The Equality of Opportunity," was conducted by researchers from University of California, Berkeley, Stanford University, Brown University and the U.S. Department of the Treasury. Linfield also ranked as the top liberal arts college in Washington and Oregon in Washington Monthly's "Best Bang for the Buck" list in 2016 and 2017. Washington Monthly also identifies Linfield as one of the top liberal arts colleges nationally, ranking it 81st out of 240 liberal arts colleges overall in 2017. Linfield has a dual enrollment agreement with Portland Community College.

Linfield University was included in the Foundation for Individual Rights in Education's annual list of "10 Worst Colleges for Free Speech" in 2022.

Athletics
Linfield offers varsity sports in Baseball, Men's Basketball, Women's Basketball, Cross-Country, Football, Men's Golf, Women's Golf, Women's Lacrosse, Women's Soccer, Men's Soccer, Softball, Swimming, Women's Tennis, Men's Tennis, Track & Field, Women's Volleyball, Men's Wrestling and Women's Wrestling. 

Linfield also offers thirteen intramural sports opportunities.

"The Streak" 
The Linfield Wildcats football team has the longest streak of consecutive winning seasons across all levels of college football. , the team has had 66 consecutive winning seasons. "The Streak", as it is referred to at Linfield, began in 1956.  The Linfield University Special Collections and Archives started an oral history video collection from members of the 1956 football team, which was made available to the public in October 2021.

Famous alumni student-athletes 
Top athletics alumni include former New York Yankee Scott Brosius, who was the head baseball coach at the college for eight years until 2015; former San Diego Charger Brett Elliott, the quarterback of the 2004 championship team; and former Miami Dolphins general manager, Randy Mueller, quarterback of Linfield's 1982 NAIA Championship squad.

National championships 
Linfield has won four national college football titles (NCAA Division III: 2004, NAIA Division II: 1982, 1984, 1986) and have played in a total of seven college football national championship games (NAIA runner-up in 1961, 1965, 1992). In addition, the school has won three national titles in baseball (NCAA Division III: 2013, NAIA Division II: 1966, 1971). The Linfield Softball team won two NCAA Division III Softball Championships in 2007 & 2011, and were runner-up in 2010 & 2012.

Student life
Linfield University offers over 40 organizations on campus and over 300 leadership positions. The Associated Students of Linfield University (ASLU) or the Wildcat Entertainment Board (WEB) sponsor all clubs and student-led activities.

Campus media
In addition to clubs and organizations, there is an active media presence on campus, in the form of a college radio station and newspaper, both of which include student involvement.

KSLC

90.3 KSLC was an entirely student-run college radio station with reception throughout town and the immediate vicinity. The full-time student-staff consisted of ten members, who work under the guidance of one faculty advisor. All work for KSLC was on a volunteer basis, but credit was also available through the electronic media practices and broadcast practices courses at Linfield. It played a wide variety of music and also broadcast Linfield Wildcat sporting events and there were specialty shows every weeknight. The station was housed in Pioneer Hall until 2007 when a new facility was completed in the basement of Renshaw Hall. Additionally, the radio station promoted its student-run shows as podcasts.

On April 2, 2020, KSLC flipped to a simulcast of classical music KQAC, and the school donated the station's license to All Classical Public Media, Inc. effective November 19, 2020.

The Linfield Review 

The Linfield Review is Linfield's student-run weekly campus newspaper. The newspaper is staffed only by students of the college and funded mostly through the Associated Students of Linfield University.  According to the March 16, 2007, issue of the newspaper, the Linfield Review took third place in the Best in Show contest at the Associated Collegiate Press national college newspaper convention in Portland. In 2021, the publication received 10 awards from the Pacific Northwest Association of Journalism Educators for its website and individual pieces of content by the student staff. Outgoing editor Maddie Loverich was received the 2021 Region 10 Mark of Excellence Award for sports writing (small division) for her article, "Freshman makes big impact for Linfield softball."

Greek organizations

, there are three fraternities and four sororities at Linfield University.  The sororities are Alpha Phi (ΑΦ), Zeta Tau Alpha (ΖΤΑ), Sigma Kappa Phi (ΣΚΦ), and Phi Sigma Sigma (ΦΣΣ).  The fraternities include Delta Psi Delta (ΔΨΔ), Pi Kappa Alpha (ΠΚΑ), and Theta Chi (ΘΧ). Sigma Kappa Phi and Delta Psi Delta are both local organizations and have no national affiliation. The sororities at Linfield University do not have housing.

Notable people

Notable people who have attended or taught at Linfield University include athletes such as Scott Brosius, former New York Yankee and 1998 World Series MVP; Kenneth Scott Latourette, scholar of Christianity and Chinese History; Douglas Robinson, translation theorist; Amy Tan, the author of The Joy Luck Club, The Bonesetter's Daughter, and The Kitchen God's Wife; First Lieutenant Rex T. Barber, pilot in Operation Vengeance; actress Aparna Brielle; and Joe Medicine Crow, Native American historian and the only Linfield University graduate to receive the Presidential Medal of Freedom.

References

External links

 

Educational institutions established in 1858
Universities and colleges affiliated with the American Baptist Churches USA
Buildings and structures in McMinnville, Oregon
Universities and colleges accredited by the Northwest Commission on Colleges and Universities
Education in Yamhill County, Oregon
1858 establishments in Oregon Territory
Private universities and colleges in Oregon